Acanthocinus elegans is a species of longhorn beetles of the subfamily Lamiinae. It was described by Ludwig Ganglbauer in 1884, and is endemic to Iran. The beetles live approximately one year, and inhabit deciduous trees.

References

Beetles described in 1884
Acanthocinus
Beetles of Asia